Mamadou Lamine "Bara" Diop (born 14 August 1992) is a Senegalese basketball player for AS Douanes of the Basketball Africa League.

Professional career
Born in M'Bour, Diop started playing for M'Bour Basket Club. He also enjoyed playing football but chose basketball at a later age. Diop started his career with AS Douanes in the Nationale 1, the national top tier level. In 2017, Diop left to play for the team of DUC Dakar.

In January 2021, Diop returned to AS Douanes. Diop was on the roster for AS Douanes in the 2021 BAL season. He led the team in rebounding and helped Douanes reach the quarterfinals of the tournament. Diop also led the league in steals with 2.5 per game.

BAL career statistics

|-
| style="text-align:left;"|2021
| style="text-align:left;"|AS Douanes
| 4 || 4 || 31.4 || .465 || .357 || .500 || 7.3 || 1.5 || style="background:#cfecec;"| 2.5* || 1.3 || 12.3
|-
|- class="sortbottom"
| style="text-align:center;" colspan="2"|Career
| 4 || 4 || 31.4 || .465 || .357 || .500 || 7.3 || 1.5 || 2.5 || 1.3 || 12.3

Personal
Diop graduated from Cheikh Anta Diop University.

References

External links
RealGM profile

1992 births
AS Douanes basketball players
Living people
DUC Dakar players
People from M'Bour
Senegalese men's basketball players
Power forwards (basketball)